Jacob Raiford (born May 19, 1986), better known by his stage name Roqy Tyraid (often stylized RoQy TyRaiD), is an American rapper from San Diego, California. In 2015, Raiford signed to New York-based independent distribution labelled Soulspazm Records for the release of his 2016 album The Dichotomy of RoQy TyRaiD, which would secure 3 singles placements on indie college charts.

Early life 
Roqy Tyraid was born Jacob Raiford in San Diego, California, growing up in the South Bay region until his high school years when he relocated to Los Angeles County. He adopted the name “J RoQ” as he was the youngest in his group of peers.

Following high school, Raiford relocated to Arizona to attend college.

Music career

2004–2008: Beginnings 
Raiford, still going by J RoQ, spent the time he was not attending school in Arizona, back and forth between Pomona, California, where his camp relocated and formed Tak Ovr Ent, with DJ Metric at the helm, and included hip-hop act 60 East. Their flagship artist was Raiford’s close friend Paul McAdams p.k.a. Space Ghost. Since McAdams was already the more established artist, having built momentum and a reputation in the Inland Empire’s music scene as a performer and battle rapper, it was decided he would be the first artist pushed collectively, with Raiford coming shortly after that. They collaborated on McAdams’ project House on Haunted hill. On July 28, 2006, Paul McAdams and close friend and collaborator Brendan, p.k.a. Sank, were ambushed and shot while heading to their show, McAdams did not survive. In the wake of the tragedy and incarceration of other key members, the group disbanded shortly after that. Raiford decided to continue his pursuits in his new home in Phoenix, Arizona. Within the year, Raiford had partnered up with Grammy-Nominated producer Dion Brigham p.k.a. Checkin Trapps, and set about making a name for themselves through numerous local and regional shows. Raiford embarked on a marketing campaign that consisted of hand-to-hand selling his first two mixtapes Prequel 2 Bootlegs and Hiatus RoQ, which he claims sold around twenty thousand copies between winter 2006 and mid-2008. At local shows, Raiford would occasionally rap battle the crowd if he felt it consisted of too many rappers. He would preemptively advertise this on Myspace as “Going On A Tirade”. In a late 2008 conversation with Chino XL, whom Raiford had known since he was 16 due to being the friend and groupmate of his son-in-law, Raiford lamented the difficulty in finding a name uniquely his. Out of respect for the legendary J Rocc, Raiford decided to retire the use of the moniker and find something more appropriate to his artistic image. Chino XL suggested using “Tirade”, having heard the story. Raiford agreed although he wanted to keep a semblance of his former name when Roqy Tyraid was conceptualized as both “Roq and Tirade”.

2009–2010: RoQy TyRaiD - The New Millennium Man 
While deciding how to utilize this new creative growth best, he came across and befriended Rampage of Flipmode Squad Fame, the cousin of Busta Rhymes, who recruited Raiford onto his label Deep Freeze. Raiford refined his craft and learned much from the veteran emcee before eventually disengaging to manage his career better. Raiford immediately sought dominance over and recognition from his immediate scene in Phoenix, AZ, by releasing singles to local DJs, engaging in notable record battles resulting in dethroning of respected emcees from the community, and finding his way onto terrestrial radio. By late 2010, he would put together his first release as Roqy Tyraid with The New Millennium Man, a mixtape consisting of original songs and mixtape records containing obscure instrumentals from producers he hoped to work within one capacity or another eventually. His first single, "Woosah" which featured a sample of Pointer Sisters' "Pinball Number Count", was the repurposing of a popular Sesame Street song, which Raiford used to formally introduce himself as the comical, sporadically abrasive character Roqy Tyraid tended to take on. The visual was shot in stop-motion, a tongue-in-cheek ode to Sesame Street. The video was mildly successful receiving support from online publications such as AllHipHop and social media support from Grammy Award winner 9th Wonder. The New Millennium Man would do mildly successful in the Hip Hop blogosphere of the era, landing on various blogs and introducing online browsers to an artist quickly described as "quintessentially hip-hop".

2011–2014: The Podium, loose singles, and The Wake Up Show 
Following the conclusion of self-promoting his project, The New Millennium Man, Raiford sought to double down on his momentum with a weekly series detailing current events specific to that week in time. He was initially approached by Phoenix DJ and on-air personality Ramses Ja, brother of Dilated People's Rakaa Iriscience, to do a weekly segment for his show with Bootleg Kev called Ready Set Radio, which was aired out of both Phoenix, AZ, and Las Vegas, NV. For the next three quarters, Raiford would chronologically detail events such as the Egyptian revolution, the crises in Libya, Japan's earthquake and subsequent tsunami and irradiation, and other vital events shaping the globe. This became a cult favorite. Raiford wants to create another installment of the series in the on-coming future. DJ John Blaze from Phoenix, AZ, is credited for facilitating the recording and editing and is often mentioned throughout the series. Following this venture, Raiford returned to releasing stand-out singles and visuals, including the socially-aggressive "Break Shit" and the viral-lexicon-responsible "Bye Felicia", a facetious song describing romantic disasters. Around this time, he began heavily touring and engaging in spot dates across the country. Notably, Raiford joined an online radio station titled Skyyhook Radio, which featured acts such as Headkrack & The Bodega Brovas, A Tribe Called Quest's Jarobi White, and the occasional feature from legendary personality Combat Jack. Raiford continued to excel as an online radio personality while using opportunities to advance his career in emceeing. Notably, in the winter of 2013, having already been in rotation on Shade 45 and The Wake Up Show for the duration of that year was offered the opportunity to participate in a one-off live cipher called The Wake Up Show: Unplugged. The show was an impromptu jam session, which would be hosted by both Sway & King Tech, and include live mixing from D.J. Revolution. The live band included Anderson.Paak (credited as A.P.), Bobby & IZ Avila, Andre Desantana, and Tru James. Having performed beyond expectation, this would serve as an introductory hallmark in Raiford's career. 2014 was business as usual, seeing an increase in show bookings and refining Raiford's presence as he shifted attention towards his official album, The Dichotomy of RoQy TyRaiD. At this time, he joined the terrestrial radio show The Clean Up Crew, hosted by Nick Norris on KWSS 93.9  in Phoenix, Arizona. Due to ratings pulled in by their show, the station would achieve a #1 rating by 2016. 2014 would see several mentions in “Best Of” lists for independent/underground hip-hop acts, on sites such as AllHipHop, for example. A trend which would continue moving forward.

2015–2016: The Dichotomy of RoQy TyRaiD and global touring 
At the beginning of 2015, RoQy turned his attention towards completing his album The Dichotomy of RoQy TyRaiD and researching appropriate labels to release it from possibly. The album was recorded at HKS Studios in Phoenix, Arizona, and mastered by DJ Pickster One. 
Raiford took his time working on the project's release, believing that artists only get one official debut album. As such, between its initial conceptualization in 2012 and 2013, he claims to have changed the album's tracklisting five times before being satisfied with the records by official completion in the summer of 2015. During this timeframe, he attempted to shop the album to various respected labels in the underground hip-hop industry, to no satisfaction. While weighing the difficulty of releasing his album 100% solely on his own, he was introduced to Jim Drew, head of Soulspazm Records, via Raiford's DJ and good friend Terrance "SlopfunkDust" Harding. After hearing the album in its entirety, Drew immediately expressed interest in working with Raiford, and a contract to release the album was drawn up, reviewed, and notarized. RoQy concluded his tenure at Skyyhook Radio and announced the signing via social media shortly after his performance at the A3C Festival in Atlanta, Georgia. In December 2015, The Dichotomy of RoQy TyRaiD was released simultaneously with the lead single "Hey You" to provide an easily accessible discography of the latest music. This experiment worked in Raiford's favor, as the success of "Hey You" garnered more attention for him and his catalog of present and past music. Both "Hey You" and the Slopfunkdust-produced "Over The Horizon" would go on to do exceptionally well in the indie college charts, as documented by RapAttackLives, with "Hey You" landing at Number One. Other stand-out records include the Oddisee-produced "Barefoot Running" and "Application, Dedication, Discipline" produced by Phoenix-based producer Arza1990. The latter's visual was released in January 2017 and paid homage to Office Space and Spike Lee. The storyteller song "The RaiD", an orally descriptive action story, is described by Raiford to be part of a more extensive series he will further explore through future 2018 releases. By early 2016, the indie success of TDORT awarded Raiford with opportunities to tour overseas for the first time. He and Slopfunkdust embarked on The Dichotomy Tour, which took them through the UK and Europe as headliners in Raiford's first foray across the pond. Upon returning, he immediately set foot on touring North America for the remainder of the year.
On October 31, 2016, the visual “Kenny Powers” was released, which featured a Purge hunt of a Donald Trump supporter. By 2016, Raiford had completed a successful year of expansion and touring.

2017: Redirection 
Coming off a successful year, Raiford dedicated 2017 to further the reach of his music through high-profile releases. He continued to engage in successful festivals and provide content for emaciated supporters awaiting his next release. The release of "Crown Me" saw a return to the indie college charts, as verified by RapAttackLives, for an extended stay within the top ten for over 6 weeks. The single peaked at #2, his second highest ranking in college radio. The visual is considered groundbreaking and creatively revolutionary. In their third collaboration since "Woosah" and "Break Shit", Raiford teamed up with Phoenix Sun's visual arts director Derrick Reed for a cinematic experience appreciated by hip-hop fans and cult movie fanatics. Raiford was inserted into cult hits such as Black Dynamite, The Warriors, Akira, and Game of Death, taking on the antagonist's identity in a jarringly comical manner while providing trademark lyricism. This work catapulted him into the lexicon of major labels seeking inquiry on the artist. During this year, The Clean Up Crew joined the online platform Radiosupa and was eventually picked up by iHeart Radio. This year, he also debuted an online-only release titled A LP Has No Name featuring unreleased Dichotomy records. RoQy cited that he wanted "to give my support some dessert before the dinner" regarding waiting for his next project. Raiford ended the year on the radar of powerful record entities.

2018: Present 
During a show in Dec 2017, RoQy TyRaiD announced he is working on a follow-up to The Dichotomy of RoQy TyRaiD, with intent to release in 2018, and was rumored to have provided a sneak peek of an upcoming single. In the following interview, he stated he has been working on the album since the spring of 2017 and has already begun shooting visuals for upcoming releases. It is unknown what avenue he will release his next body of work from.

Musical style

Influences 
When asked about his influences, he's never stated a number one influence but has given credit to several artists. Artists he has consistently named have been acts such as Little Brother, Nas, Common, Eminem, Busta Rhymes, and Jay-Z, the latter he says inspired him to push himself by typically refusing not to physically write down lyrics, despite the complexity of his rhymes. In The New Millennium Man, RoQy was quoted in:
 “Under New Management” with “But I digress, raised on Snoop and Common Sense/ Jay, The Roots, some Nas and Em to Jada, Cube, Elzhi and Def / Jayo, Guru, Tribe Called Quest, Dre, The Wu, and Das Efx / Phonte, Big Pooh, Bilal, and Treach to name a few whom I’m in debt / “.
He has also listed acts outside hip-hop playing influencing roles, such as Rage Against The Machine, Cannonball Adderley, John Coltrane, Miles Davis, The Prodigy, Nirvana, and The Foo Fighters. In a 2015 interview, he claimed his appreciation for creative videos came from Busta Rhymes, Missy, Redman, and Ludacris. Raiford's love for movies is evident through various references typically played out in visual form via video themes.

Rapping technique 
In the same vein of legends such as Jay-Z, RoQy TyRaiD typically opts not to write lyrics down, expressing a stronger connection to the craft by memorizing it "feeling for feeling", per bar. He argues a staunch difference between memorizing lyrics that are considered minimalist and the high content verses he's known for and, as such, has defined the process as "memarap". Although, this was stated in an interview and debatably be a casual reference to something challenging to typify accurately. Whether there is a high-syllable count or it is minimal, RoQy has gone on record stating that he sometimes translates his thoughts into syllables and not necessarily words. "This allows me dexterity in conveying the message, as opposed to forcing a bunch of lyrics and being some one-dimensional, rappity-rap dude." He believes in Bruce Lee's water philosophy, in allowing the lyrics and energy of the performance uniqueness as opposed to static cadences and vocal tones. In songs such as "The RaiD", he can be heard changing his accent to emphasize the dialogue in that particular section is being said by another character to pull listeners into his universe further. In "Kenny Powers," he can be heard warping his vocals to take on a bullhorn effect, creating a chaotic atmosphere. Regardless of execution, he typically strives to push for the advancement of lyricism in all his work. He has used Black Thought, Royce Da 5'9, and Busta Rhymes as paragons of artists who effortlessly adapt to songs without compromise and want to live up to, if not surpass, their examples.

He describes his music as created for the average person without a peg to fit in.

Personal life 
RoQy TyRaiD is the second youngest of five children. He currently resides in Phoenix, Arizona. In the song "Children of Men," he raps a song to his nephew, lamenting his fleeting presence in his nephew's life. He has also talked about his religious upbringing in his father's household in the song "Preach" but has more than once expressed having regretted including family members in his music who would not be able to represent themselves accurately. He has cited his mother and her fiancée as significant influences in falling in love with hip-hop, as well as his oldest brother for introducing him to different genres of music as a child. He stated he used to steal his brother's hidden records and listen to them when he left for work. RoQy is a former member of the Universal Zulu Nation's Southwest Chapter. Having left before controversy surrounding, Afrika Bambaataa arose. He has been interviewed by the news for leading BLM marches in Tempe, AZ but refuses to acknowledge himself as a traditional activist, giving honor to individuals such as Chuck D, Talib Kweli, Harry Belafonte, and Jasiri X whenever the topic comes up. In 2018, Tyraid was controversial after making seemingly anti-Semitic statements about Mac Miller via Facebook. This offended much of RoQy's fanbase due to coming on the day of Miller's passing. He quickly deleted these statements after backlash. Despite varied experiences, he considers himself an introverted nerd who loves video games, anime, sports, movies, and music. He was a small-time vinyl collector specializing in soundtracks and movie scores.

Discography 
 The New Millennium Man (2010)
 RoQy TyRaiD @ The Podium: A Musical Editorial (2011)
 The Dichotomy of RoQy TyRaiD (2015)
 A LP Has No Name (2017)

References 

1986 births
American rappers
Living people
21st-century American rappers